Pale, Dharwad is a village in Dharwad district of Karnataka, India.

Demographics 
As of the 2011 Census of India there were 229 households in Pale and a total population of 1,077 consisting of 552 males and 525 females. There were 128 children ages 0-6.

References

Villages in Dharwad district